Cormac McCarthy (born c. 1952) is an American folk singer-songwriter. He was born in Ohio but moved to rural New Hampshire at age ten. He was inspired to play music when his sister, visiting home from college, brought records by Joan Baez, Bob Dylan, and Eric Andersen, and he traded his clarinet for a guitar. He was college roommates with Bill Morrissey, who encouraged him to perform his music in public, and co-wrote the songs "Marigold Hall" and "Married Man" with Morrissey. He lives in southern Maine.

Discography
 Cormac McCarthy
 Troubled Sleep
 Picture Gallery Blues
 Curious Thing
 Collateral (2013) which features two songs addressed to Morrissey: "Doppelganger" and "The Crossroad"

References

Cormac McCarthy sees his presence growing. The Telegraph.
McCarthy makes hard times go down easy. The Boston Globe.
McCarthy stretches out on 'Collateral'. The Boston Globe.
KMBG, Cormac McCarthy highlight return of Cold River Radio Show March 8. The Conway Daily Sun.
Winter concert series to feature Elizabeth Lorrey and Cormac McCarthy. Portsmouth Herald.

External links
 Official web site
 
 

American male singer-songwriters
American folk musicians
Musicians from Cincinnati
Year of birth missing (living people)
Living people
People from Sullivan County, New Hampshire
Singer-songwriters from Ohio